Southerness  is a small, compact coastal village in Scotland, Dumfries and Galloway. The town today is mainly a tourist village and has for many years had a large number of static caravans, some private and many rented to holiday makers. The local bus services to and from Dalbeattie and Dumfries are more frequent during the summer season.

Southerness has a large, shallow, sandy beaches on both sides of the rocky next to the village and to the west extend out to the vast Mersehead Sands exposed at low tide. The only landmark is its Southerness lighthouse which was built in 1749 and is one of the oldest lighthouses in Scotland. The lighthouse stands approximately 56 feet (17 m) tall and was decommissioned in the 1930s.

One of the two golf courses was redesigned in 1947 by course manager Mackenzie Ross.

The village has to the north a magnificent backdrop of the "marilyn" Criffel, and to the south the sandy (please note the quick sand) bay of Gillfoot. On clear days the views stretch across the Solway Firth to the Lakeland fells.

Tourist facilities
 18-hole golf course
 JJ's fish and chip shop
 Paul Jones Hotel
 19th Hole bar
 Mermaid Bar
 The Venue
 The Minimarket
 Evening entertainment "during the high season"
 Two ParkDean caravan parks

Caravan parks

LightHouse Leisure

LightHouse Leisure is a family run park with about 200 caravans. It also has the Mermaid Bar on site where bingo is offered most evenings during the season, and a swimming pool with tanning booth. LightHouse Leisure is about a 2-minute walk away from the beach and lighthouse of Southerness.

Southerness Holiday Park
Southerness Holiday Park is owned by Parkdean Resorts. There is a new multi-purpose swimming pool, built in 2011, with flumes, a toddlers' pool, and a 25-metre swimming pool. The site also has a nature trail.

References

External links

Southerness Golf Club
Southerness Holiday Village
LightHouse Leisure Caravan Park

Villages in Dumfries and Galloway